Thomas Fortson Gibbs (1798–1859) was an American politician who served as the 5th mayor of Atlanta.

In John H. James' remembrances of this time, he describes the mayor as "Dr. Gibbs" but doesn't explain what sort of doctor. He represented Elbert County, Georgia in the state house in 1837 and came to Atlanta after 1850. He ran and won as the city's fifth mayor for 1852 and ran for a second term January 17, 1853 but was defeated by John Mims. Shortly after this, he left town, possibly to Memphis, Tennessee. He was married to Caroline Rebecca Harris (1807–1888) and they had eight children before his death.

Gibbs left Atlanta fairly soon after finishing his term as its fifth mayor.

Notes

References
 Garrett, Franklin, Atlanta and Its Environs, 1954, University of Georgia Press.

1798 births
1859 deaths
Mayors of Atlanta